Bernstadt auf dem Eigen is a town in the Görlitz district, in Saxony, Germany. It is situated 16 km north of Zittau, and 16 km southwest of Görlitz.

History
Within the German Empire (1871-1918), Bernstadt was part of the Kingdom of Saxony. Within the East German Bezirk Dresden, it was part of Kreis Löbau.

Notable residents 

 Adolf Klose (1844-1923), machine engineer, Saxon State Railroad
 Herbert Seifert (1907-1996), mathematician
 Klaus Riedel (1907-1944), rocket pioneer

References 

Populated places in Görlitz (district)